Commander USA's Groovie Movies is an American movie showcase series that ran weekend afternoons on the USA Network.

The show premiered January 5, 1985 and ran through 1989. It was hosted by Jim Hendricks as "Commander USA" (Soaring super hero! Legion of Decency - Retired), a wacky but slightly seedy blue-collar comic book superhero who occasionally displayed powers such as "microwave vision" (usually to prepare a mid-movie meal of fish or eggs).

Overview
The show originally ran double features of horror and science fiction movies on Saturday afternoons, then later a single feature on Sunday afternoons. Later movies on the show tended to be Mexican wrestling films or heavily edited violent films from Japan.

The Commander's show originated from a secret headquarters located under a New Jersey shopping mall. The Commander was almost always enthusiastic about the films he showed, whether it was a "gem" like Inframan, Blood Beast Horror, or any other number of Grade-Z celluloid oddities. The Commander was often joined on the program by either his agent (Barry Kluger) or "Lefty", a hand puppet created by drawing a face on his right hand with cigar ash. Over the course of a show, Lefty's face would inevitably get smeared or washed off, but the Commander would always redraw it with his unlit cigar.

In 1988, Eclectic Publishing published Commander USA's World of Horror, a 32-page magazine which was intended to be published bi-monthly, but only one issue was ever released.

In all, more than 200 episodes were produced.

Movies shown

The Abominable Snowman of the Himalayas
The Alligator People
Animal Crackers
Alone in the Dark
An American Werewolf in London
The Aztec Mummy
Bedlam
Beginning of the End
Black Carrion
The Black Cat
Blood and Roses
Bloodbath at the House of Death
The Blood Beast Terror
The Blood of Nostradamus
Blood Song
The Bloody Vampire
The Brainiac
The Brood
The Brute Man
Bug
Captain Kronos, Vampire Hunter
Cat People
Cave of the Living Dead
The Children
Child's Play
C.H.U.D.
The Contraption
The Corvini Inheritance
Countess Dracula
The Crawling Eye
The Creature Wasn't Nice 
Cry Wolf
The Curse of Frankenstein
Curse of Nostradamas
Curse of the Aztec Mummy
The Curse of the Cat People
The Curse of the Crying Woman
Curse of the Doll People
Curse of the Vampire
Dance of the Dwarfs
Dark Forces
The Day Mars Invaded Earth
The Death Kiss
’’The Death of Bruce Lee’’
Demonoid
The Devil Bat
The Devil Bat's Daughter
The Devil's Gift
The Devil's Nightmare
Doctor of Doom
Dracula
Exorcism at Midnight
The Final Terror
The Flying Serpent
Frankenstein and the Monster from Hell
Frankenstein Must Be Destroyed
Fräulein Doktor
Friday the 13th
Friday the 13th Part 2
Friday the 13th Part III
Gamera vs. Barugon
Genii of Darkness
God Told Me To
The Hearse
Hercules in New York
The Hills Have Eyes Part II
Horror of the Blood Monsters
Horror of the Zombies
Horror Planet a.k.a. Inseminoid
House of Psychotic Women
House of the Long Shadows
House of 1,000 Dolls
The House Where Evil Dwells
I Married a Monster from Outer Space
I Walked with a Zombie
Inframan
In Search of Dracula
Invasion of the Vampires
Island Claws
Island Monster
It's Alive
J. D.'s Revenge
Kingdom of the Spiders
Land of the Minotaur
  Las Vegas Weekend
Laserblast
The Late Nancy Irving
Let's Scare Jessica to Death
Little Mad Guy
The Little Shop of Horrors
The Living Coffin
The Living Head
The Loch Ness Horror
Mako, The Jaws of Death
The Man and the Monster
The Man and the Snake
The Man With the Synthetic Brain
Mark of the Devil
Mark of the Vampire
Mausoleum
The Monster Demolisher
Monster in the Closet
My Bloody Valentine
Night of the Creeps
Pandemonium (film)
Panic
The Pied Piper
A Polish Vampire in Burbank
The Possession of Joel Delaney
Princess of the Nile
The Premonition
Psychophobia
The Psychotronic Man
One Dark Night
Q, the Winged Serpent
Rabid
The Robot vs. The Aztec Mummy
Samson vs. the Vampire Woman
Samson in the Wax Museum
Satanik
Savage Sisters
Scared to Death
Shanghai Massacre
Simon, King of the Witches
The Space Children
Stranglehold
Student Bodies
Swamp of the Lost Monster
Tales That Witness Madness
Taste the Blood of Dracula
The Terror
They Still Call Me Bruce
Three in the Attic
Trick or Treats
Toxic Zombies
Undersea Kingdom
The Unseen
Up in the Cellar
The Vampire 
The Vampire Bat
Vampire Circus
The Vampire's Coffin
What?
What's Up, Tiger Lily?
The Witchmaker
The Witch's Mirror
The Woman Who Came Back
Women in Chains
World of the Vampires
Zorro's Black Whip

References

External links

American television shows featuring puppetry
Horror movie television series
1980s American comedy television series
1980s American variety television series
Midnight movie television series
1985 American television series debuts
1989 American television series endings
USA Network original programming
English-language television shows